Hanna Viktorivna Vasylenko (born 21 February 1986) is a Ukrainian female wrestler. She is the 2011 World champion and 2012 European champion in the 59 kg category.

External links
bio on fila-wrestling.com

Living people
1986 births
Ukrainian female sport wrestlers
World Wrestling Championships medalists
Sportspeople from Zaporizhzhia Oblast
21st-century Ukrainian women